What If Leaving Is a Loving Thing is the fourth studio album by Swedish band Sahara Hotnights, released through their own record company Stand By Your Band.

Track listing
All songs written by Maria Andersson and Josephine Forsman.
"Visit to Vienna" – 3:53
"The Loneliest City of All" – 3:43
"Salty Lips" – 3:25
"Neon Lights" – 3:55
"No for an Answer" – 4:41
"Cheek to Cheek" – 3:17
"Getting Away with Murder" – 4:21
"Puppy" – 3:13
"Static" – 4:14
"If Anyone Matters It's You" – 2:48

Personnel
Maria Andersson  – Lead vocals, guitar
Jennie Asplund  –  guitar, backing vocals
Johanna Asplund  –  bass, backing vocals
Josephine Forsman  – Drums

Charts

Weekly charts

Year-end charts

References

Sahara Hotnights albums
2007 albums
Albums produced by Björn Yttling